The 2015 Sun Devils football team represented Arizona State University in the 2015 NCAA Division I FBS football season. They were led by fourth-year head coach Todd Graham and played their home games at Sun Devil Stadium. They were a member of the South Division of the Pac-12 Conference.

Personnel

Coaching staff

Previous season and offseason
Arizona State finished the 2014 season 10–3 (6–3 in the Pac-12), with a 36–31 victory over Duke in the Sun Bowl. The Sun Devils began the season ranked #19 in the AP Poll and won their first three games convincingly, but suffered a major loss when third-year starting quarterback Taylor Kelly broke his foot against Colorado. Backup junior Mike Bercovici made his first career start in a 62–27 loss to UCLA, the Sun Devils' worst loss under Todd Graham. The team quickly bounced back with a 38–34 victory over USC thanks to a Hail Mary with no time remaining to Jaelen Strong, a play dubbed by the media as the "Jael Mary". This momentum carried on as the Sun Devils defeated perennial Pac-12 power Stanford on ESPN.

Kelly returned from injury against Washington, and led them to a 24–10 victory. The following week ASU won a critical Pac-12 South game against top-25 Utah on a Zane Gonzalez field-goal in overtime. The following week, the Sun Devils played their biggest game in the Todd Graham era against highly ranked Notre Dame, a game that many analysts viewed as an elimination game for a spot in the first-ever College Football Playoff. ASU stormed out of the gates leading 34–3 late in the first half, and although the Irish managed to cut the lead to 3 in the fourth quarter, the Sun Devils pulled away and secured a 55–31 victory. With the win, ASU moved into the top-10 for the first time since the 2007 season. The good feelings did not last long however as the Sun Devils were upset the following week at Oregon State. Despite the loss, ASU went into the final week of the season with a chance to clinch the Pac-12 South championship, and earn the right to play Oregon in the Pac-12 Championship Game.

In the final week of the regular season, ASU was fighting for the Pac-12 South with UCLA, and in-state rival Arizona. UCLA was considered the favorite since they were playing unranked Stanford. But with a loss, the Arizona-Arizona State game would decide the division champ. Both games kicked off simultaneously, and word had reached Tucson that Stanford upset UCLA with minutes to play. Arizona pulled away and defeated the Sun Devils 42–35, clinching the Pac-12 South. The following week, the Wildcats were defeated by Oregon who was selected to play in the inaugural College Football Playoff. ASU was invited to the Sun Bowl where they were matched with Duke. The game was expected to be a shootout as both teams had dynamic offenses. A late interception by ASU's Kweishi Brown sealed a 36–31 victory for the Sun Devils. Freshman running back Demario Richard scored all four Sun Devil touchdowns, and Zane Gonzalez added three field goals. A critical play was freshman Kalen Ballage's 96-yard kickoff return after Duke had taken a 31–30 lead to set up the go-ahead score. The 2014 season was a successful one in Todd Graham's third year as head coach. It marked the first time since 1973 Arizona State won ten or more games in back-to-back seasons.

Players drafted

Reference:

Class of 2015 signees

Schedule

Reference:

Game summaries

Texas A&M

Cal Poly

New Mexico

USC

UCLA

Colorado

Utah

Oregon

Washington State

Washington

Arizona

California

West Virginia

Rankings

References

Arizona State
Arizona State Sun Devils football seasons
Arizona State Sun Devils football